Oswaldo is an animated television series created by Pedro Eboli for Cartoon Network. The series is co-produced by Birdo Studio and Symbiosys Entertainment. It first premiered on Cartoon Network in Brazil on October 11, 2017 and on TV Cultura on October 29, 2017.

The series is produced by Birdo Studio, which is notoriously recognized as one of the main Brazilian animation studios and gained worldwide fame by creating and developing the   mascots of the 2016 Summer Olympics and Summer Paralympics. The studio also developed the short films involving the 2 mascots that were shown on Cartoon Network Brazil  during the period prior to the games.

The show was a runner-up for an idea pitching project in Brazil, back in 2014, with 'Cartoon.Job' being the overall winner, however it was eventually picked up for a full series.

On September 23, 2017, it was announced that the series had its international distribution rights secured by Kid Glove. On February 7, 2018, it was announced the show had been renewed for a 39-episode second season starting June 3, 2019.

The title sequence of the show was done by Dutch-American director Fons Schiedon.

Plot 
Oswaldo shows the daily life of a 12-year old penguin who is in the 6th grade. Together with his friends Tobias and Leia, he faces the challenge of surviving school. With agile humor and a lot of bites from Brazilian pop culture, the series follows the title character and his immense ability to transform the simplest situations in life into epic journeys. Oswaldo's oddities are part of the daily life of his family and friends who understand that it is our eccentricities that make each of us special.

Characters 
 Oswaldo (voiced by Joel Vieira) A 12-year-old penguin.
 Leia (voiced by Melissa Garcia) Oswaldo's best friend.
 Tobias (voiced by Vini Wolf) Oswaldo's best friend.

Voice cast

Brazilian Portuguese cast 
 Joel Vieira as Oswaldo
 Melissa Garcia as Leia
 Vini Wolf as Tobias

Episodes

International release

References

External links 
 Official Facebook page for the show
 Official Facebook page for the company

2010s Brazilian animated television series
2017 Brazilian television series debuts
2017 Indian television series debuts
2017 animated television series debuts
Brazilian children's animated adventure television series
Indian children's animated adventure television series
Brazilian children's animated comedy television series
Brazilian flash animated television series
Portuguese-language television shows
English-language television shows
Cartoon Network original programming
Animated television series about children
Animated television series about penguins